Hagnagora mirandahenrichae is a species of moth of the family Geometridae first described by Gunnar Brehm in 2015. It is only known from the sectors Santa Maria and Pitilla from Área de Conservación Guanacaste, Guanacaste Province, in north-western Costa Rica.

Adults are easily distinguished from Hagnagora croceitincta by its wing patterns. The yellow ground colour of H. mirandahenrichae is slightly more intense than in Hagnagora clustimena.

Etymology
The species is named in honour of Ms. Miranda Henrich of California in recognition of her and her mother's critical support for understanding the taxonomy and biodiversity development of the Área de Conservación Guanacaste in northwestern Costa Rica.

References

Moths described in 2015
Larentiinae